is a 1989 vertical scrolling shooter video game released for the Namco System 2 arcade platform in Japan by Namco. A Sega Mega Drive port was released in 1990. The game features a plot loosely based on Greek mythology.

Gameplay

The player takes control of Apollo, who is mounted upon the back of his winged horse Pegasus; pressing the firing button makes his sword fire a tiny shot, while holding it down charges the sword up, and upon releasing the button the sword shoots a bigger fireball. Even the smallest enemies take multiple hits, so the standard shot is of little use - and each of the game's seven stages is divided into between two and four sections (the transition from one to another is indicated by a block of Japanese text appearing at the bottom of the screen and a change in music). At the end of every stage, Apollo must also defeat a boss character from Greek myth: Medusa, the Graeae, the Siren, Antaeus, Scylla (who has taken on the form of the "Crystal Brain" from the aforementioned Bakutotsu Kijūtei), Cerberus, and Typhon himself; once he has done so, he will proceed to the enchanted mirror at the back of the boss character temple, before the game segues into the next stage. Apollo can take up to four hits before dying (indicated by the "playing-cards" hearts at the bottom of the screen, and determined by how the cabinet is set), but will die instantly if he flies into a wall or touches a boss's head - and this game also features voice samples (in Japanese for the original arcade and Japanese Mega Drive versions, but in English for the North American Genesis and European Mega Drive versions). And if the "rank select" option in the arcade version's option menu has been set to "on", players will also be able to select an "easy" or "hard" game mode, once they have inserted their coin; however, the "easy" mode only features the first four stages and does not feature the game's complete ending sequence as a result of it.

Plot
The player takes control of the knight Apollo, the god of the sun, who sets off on the legendary winged horse Pegasus, to rescue his lover, Artemis, the goddess of the moon, from the Titan, Typhon. The game takes names and little else from Greek mythology in which Apollo, god of the sun, was actually Artemis's brother. The game shows players an Artemis that acts as a princess (but in Greek mythology, she was the goddess of the hunt, and took pride in never being with any man).

Release
The arcade version of this game was never released in the United States, due to Artemis's "bondage/torture" scenes, which were shown between each stage, and were similar to those from the new version of Namco's own Rolling Thunder; while no nudity is shown, the scenes were still somewhat "strong" to be shown in an arcade game during the early 16-bit era. This game's score display also gives the illusion of allowing values which do not end in "0", like Hopping Mappy, Bakutotsu Kijūtei, and Metal Hawk did before it - however, the smallest point value that the game can award to a player for killing an enemy is 10.

Reception

The Japanese magazine Game Machine listed Phelios in their March 1, 1989 issue as being the third most-popular arcade game at the time.

Notes

References

External links

1989 video games
Arcade video games
Horse-related video games
Namco arcade games
Vertically scrolling shooters
Nintendo Switch games
PlayStation 4 games
Sega Genesis games
Video games based on Greek mythology
Video games developed in Japan
Virtual Console games
Vertically-oriented video games
Hamster Corporation games